Muthupet block is a revenue block in  Tiruvarur district, Tamil Nadu, India. It has a total of 29 panchayat villages.

References 
 

Revenue blocks of Tiruvarur district